The Rideau Curling Club is a curling facility and organization located in Ottawa, Ontario, Canada. Founded in 1888, the Rideau Curling Club maintains a rivalry with the Ottawa Curling Club.

History
The original club began operation in November, 1888 as the Rideau Skating and Curling Club. The first facility of the club was the Rideau Skating Rink located on Waller Street, which opened in February 1889. The club's original president was Sir Sandford Fleming, and Governor General Lord Stanley as patron. Fleming, who had been a member of the Ottawa Curling Club started the club because the Ottawa would not serve alcoholic beverages after matches.

The club was moved from their Waller St. home in 1916, when their land was requisitioned for war purposes. Their second home (1916–1930) was approximately the present site of the Supreme Court of Canada. From 1931 until 1949 the club was located at 277 Laurier Ave West, and the club reached their present home, at Cooper and Percy Streets in July 1949.

References

External links
Rideau Curling Club official website

 Rideau Heritage Route: Rideau Curling Club

Curling clubs established in 1888
Curling clubs in Canada
Sports venues in Ottawa
Curling in Ottawa
1888 establishments in Ontario